Stormy Lola is an upcoming Spanish comedy film directed by Agustí Villaronga, which is his final film prior to his death and stars Susi Sánchez. A posthumous swan song by Villaronga, it is also his first comedy feature.

Plot 
Set in the outskirts of Barcelona, the plot follows the plight of Lola, who suffers from a worsening condition of Alzheimer and is in charge of her two grandchildren Edgar and Robert. The latter, unwilling to go to a foster home, thereby decide to take care of their grandmother, concealing her disease.

Cast

Production 
The screenplay was penned by Mario Torrecillas and Agustí Villaronga based on an original story by Torrecillas. It was shot in Barcelona in 2022. Villaronga suspended the chemotherapy of his ongoing cancer in order to shoot the film.

Release 
Loli Tormentas distribution rights in Spain are handled by Caramel Films and Youplanet Pictures. The film is set to be released theatrically in Spain on 31 March 2023. Villaronga died on January 2023, prior to the release.

See also 
 List of Spanish films of 2023

References 

Upcoming films
Spanish comedy films
Films directed by Agustí Villaronga
Films set in  Catalonia
Films shot in Barcelona
Films about Alzheimer's disease
Upcoming Spanish-language films